Nimavar (also Romanized as Nīmāvar; also known as Nemāvar) is a village in Bonab Rural District, in the Central District of Zanjan County, Zanjan Province, Iran. At the 2006 census, its population was 1,089, in 315 families.

References 

Populated places in Zanjan County